The Diapori chain is a chain of three uninhabited islands in the Argosaronikos Gulf of Greece. It includes 
St John's Island (Ayios Ioannis) in the north, Diapori Island (Tragonisi; not to be confused with Diapori, Lemnos) in the south, and St. Thomas Island (300 acres) (Ayios Thomas)  in the middle. All are currently being offered for private sale.

References

Islands of Greece
Landforms of Islands (regional unit)
Islands of Attica
Uninhabited islands of Greece